Virus mutation is mutation of viruses and may refer to:
The feature of viruses to cause mutation in the human genome
The feature of viruses to perform viral genetic change in their own genome.